Lionheart (Kelsey Leigh Kirkland), formerly called Captain Britain, is a fictional character appearing in American comic books published by Marvel Comics.

Publication history
Creators Chuck Austen and Olivier Coipel first featured her in The Avengers #77-81 (March–June 2004); in the story she sacrifices her life to protect Captain America, only to be resurrected as the new Captain Britain, but with the condition that she does not reveal her identity to her children. She went on to appear in Austen and Scott Kolins' The Avengers #82-84 (July–Aug. 2004) and Austen, Allan Jacobsen and C.P. Smith's The New Invaders #0 (Aug. 2004); in a story-line which begins with her getting angry at her own funeral causing her new teammates to begin to suspect her true identity. She made a brief supporting appearance in Brian Michael Bendis and David Finch's The Avengers #500-501 (Sept.–Oct. 2004); in which she is hospitalized in critical condition following the initial battle. Bendis and Michael Gaydos concluded her run in the Avengers with a brief appearance in Avengers Finale (Jan. 2005); in which she announces her intention to return home.

Fictional character biography
Kelsey Leigh was a single mother with two young children who lived in South-East England. She was a schoolteacher who taught English literature and history. Back when she was married, thugs invaded her home, robbing her family and gang-raping her. She fought back, hurting one of her rapists, and he cut her face with a broken bottle in revenge, scarring her permanently. Meanwhile, her husband, Richard, was too paralyzed with fear to help her. His guilt over that incident led to the dissolution of the marriage.

One fateful day, her family found themselves on the front line of a battle between the Avengers and the Wrecking Crew. Thunderball rendered Captain America unconscious and Kelsey selflessly put herself between the fallen Captain and the Wasp and their attacker, using the downed hero's shield. While the shield was indestructible, Kelsey wasn't, and the shock from the blows inflicted terrible injuries; she died en route to receiving medical attention.

Kelsey awoke to find herself in a ring of standing stones, where she was met by a vision of Brian Braddock (Captain Britain), currently ruling Otherworld, and his wife, the elemental shapeshifter Meggan. To save Britain from the evil Morgan le Fay, he passed the mantle of Captain Britain to Kelsey. Her heroic act of bravery had earned her a second chance to live and to defend her home. As was Braddock before her; Kelsey was given the choice between the Sword of Might and the Amulet of Right. However, unlike when Braddock made that choice, Kelsey was only presented with the choice between sword or amulet, and she was not informed of their symbolic importance.  Kelsey, desperate to see her children again, and not seeing how a necklace could defend anything, chose the sword, the path of violence. Instantly, she was transformed into the new Captain Britain, only to discover that her decision meant that if she ever revealed who she was to her children, it would cost their lives.

Avengers
The new Captain Britain returned to Earth, where she helped the Avengers defeat Morgan and her cronies, proving herself to be far more ruthless in battle than her predecessor, apparently killing Thunderball when she impaled him on her blade. With her children now in the Avengers' care, Kelsey accepted an offer to join the team, so that even if she could not be reunited with them, she could remain close and in their lives.

Kelsey remained a member of the Avengers until the events of Avengers Disassembled. When She-Hulk went crazy after an attack by Ultron robots, Kelsey stepped up, once again putting herself in the path of danger to rescue the fallen Captain America. She-Hulk knocked her out, and she spent the remainder of the unfolding events in hospital, her status critical. In Avengers Finale, Kelsey left the disbanding Avengers, returning home to England fully recovered.

New Excalibur
Going under the codename of Lionheart, Kelsey seeks revenge and blames Captain Britain for what happened to her; for not warning her of the consequences of choosing the Sword of Might and for losing her children.

Though unknown how it occurred, Lionheart was manipulated by Albion, a supervillain who also dislikes Captain Britain. Lionheart, though struggling to fight her conscience, would have killed Courtney Ross, the woman who shares his heart and must thus share his fate, if not for the arrival of Juggernaut and Nocturne. After a fight between Albion and Captain Britain, Lionheart and Albion fled.

Albion returns with an army of Shadow Captains and Lionheart at his side. Using a mystical device, he neutralises all forms of modern technology, plunging Britain into a pre-industrial state. The effect is catastrophic. They join forces with Shadow-X and soon after Sage joins Albion's ranks undercover as Diana Fox — code-named Britannia — Kelsey sees the error of her ways. She joins forces with Excalibur and helps defeat Albion and his Shadow Captains, restoring Britain to its former state. In acknowledgment of her help against Albion, the Government gives her a second chance working with them. Braddock suggests that it is time to set things right with her family and she is reunited with her children and mother. Pete Wisdom tells them that her disappearance was due to working for the Crown, working on a secret mission in the months since her "death".

Powers and abilities
Lionheart possesses super strength, speed, stamina, reflexes and reactions, endurance, senses, and flight. The Sword of Might gives her the ability to form energy blasts or shields.

References

External links

Avengers (comics) characters
Characters created by Chuck Austen
Comics characters introduced in 2004
British superheroes
Fictional British secret agents
Fictional characters with superhuman senses
Fictional schoolteachers
Fictional swordfighters in comics
Marvel Comics characters who use magic
Marvel Comics characters with superhuman strength
Marvel Comics mutates
United Kingdom-themed superheroes
Marvel Comics characters who can move at superhuman speeds
Marvel Comics female superheroes